The Hotel New Otani Tokyo is a large hotel located in Tokyo, Japan operated by New Otani Hotels and opened in 1964. The hotel currently has 1,479 rooms and 39 restaurants. It has hosted numerous heads of state and is home to a 400-year-old garden.

History
Construction of the hotel was requested by the Japanese government in the early 1960s, in order to fill a perceived shortage of hotel space for foreign visitors to the upcoming 1964 Summer Olympics. Yonetaro Otani, a former sumo wrestler who founded and ran a small steel company, agreed to build the hotel on a site he owned. It had formerly been the site of the Fushimi-no-miya family residence in the Kioicho district of Tokyo (and before that, the residence of samurai lord Katō Kiyomasa). The 1,085-room hotel was built in seventeen months using a number of techniques that were revolutionary in Japan at the time, such as curtain walls and prefabricated unit bathrooms. The 400-year-old garden on the site was retained as part of the hotel. The hotel was first announced under a management contract with Sheraton Hotels as the Otani-Sheraton Hotel. However, by the time of its completion, the arrangement was no longer in place, and the hotel opened as The New Otani on 1 September 1964, to coincide with the Olympics the following month.

The New Otani was the tallest building in Tokyo from 1964 until 1968, when the Kasumigaseki Building was completed. It took on an iconic status during this period, particularly for its unique revolving restaurant on the highest floor. During this time, the building was a filming location for the 1967 James Bond film You Only Live Twice, where it appeared as the headquarters of Osato Chemical & Engineering Co Ltd, the Japanese front for Ernst Stavro Blofeld's SPECTRE organization. The New Otani was greatly expanded in 1974, when the 40-storey Garden Tower opened. A third building, the 30-storey Garden Court office tower, opened in 1991. The original 1964 building, today referred to as "The Main", was extensively renovated and remodelled in 2007, when it was given a modern glass facade.

Notable guests
The hotel assumed operation of the Akasaka Palace, the Japanese State Guest House, in 1976. The palace and the hotel were the main venues of the 5th G7 summit in 1979, the 12th G7 summit in 1986, and the 19th G7 summit in 1993. The New Otani also hosted the world leaders who attended the funeral of Emperor Hirohito in 1989, the enthronement of Emperor Akihito in 1990, and the enthronement of Emperor Naruhito in 2019.

Among its other notable guests are Josip Broz Tito, U.S. President Bill Clinton, Hungarian President Árpád Göncz, King Harald V of Norway, Prime Minister Tony Blair, Russian President Vladimir Putin, Vietnamese President Nguyễn Minh Triết, Chinese Premier Wen Jiabao, Chinese President Hu Jintao, Canadian Prime Minister Stephen Harper and UK Prime Minister Theresa May.

Notes

References

External links

Hotels in Tokyo
Hotels established in 1964
Hotel New Otani Tokyo
1964 establishments in Japan
Hotel buildings completed in 1964
Hotel buildings completed in 1974
Hotel buildings completed in 1991